Feras Esmaeel (born 3 January 1983 in Damascus, Syria) is a Syrian footballer. He currently plays for Nart Sukhum, which plays in Abkhazia. He plays as a midfielder. He is an ethnic Abkhazian.

International career
Esmaeel was selected to Valeriu Tiţa's 23-man final squad for the 2011 AFC Asian Cup in Qatar. He played full 90 minutes in all Syria's three group games against Saudi Arabia, Japan and Jordan.

International goals
Scores and results table. Syria's goal tally first:

|}

Honours

Club
Al-Jaish
Syrian Premier League: 2010
Syrian Cup: 2004
AFC Cup: 2004

Al-Karamah
Syrian Premier League: 2007, 2008, 2009
Syrian Cup: 2007, 2008, 2009
Syrian Super Cup: 2008

National Team
Nehru Cup: Runner-up 2007 and 2009

References

External links

1983 births
Living people
Sportspeople from Damascus
Syrian footballers
Association football midfielders
Syria international footballers
Syrian expatriate footballers
Expatriate footballers in Iraq
Syrian expatriate sportspeople in Iraq
Syrian people of Abkhazian descent
Syrian people of Circassian descent
Al-Jaish Damascus players
Al-Karamah players
2011 AFC Asian Cup players
Syrian Premier League players